Lake St. George State Park is a public recreation area located on the northwest shore of Lake St. George in the town of Liberty, Waldo County, Maine. The lake's  support populations of landlocked salmon and brook trout. The park is managed by the Maine Department of Agriculture, Conservation and Forestry.

References

External links

Lake St. George State Park Department of Agriculture, Conservation and Forestry
Lake St. George State Park Brochure Department of Agriculture, Conservation and Forestry

State parks of Maine
Protected areas of Waldo County, Maine
St. George
St. George